Sava V was the Serbian Patriarch, primate of the Serbian Orthodox Church, in the period of 1396–1406. Upon his death, he was succeeded by Danilo IV, holding office only briefly, for a year (1406–07).

References

Sources

Patriarchs of the Serbian Orthodox Church
14th-century Serbian people
15th-century Serbian people
15th-century Eastern Orthodox archbishops
Medieval Serbian Orthodox bishops
15th-century deaths
14th-century births
14th-century Eastern Orthodox bishops